Anselmo de Almeida (born 18 August 1980) is a Brazilian footballer who currently is free agent.

External links
 Player profile 

1980 births
Living people
Brazilian footballers
Association football defenders
Brazilian expatriate footballers
Categoría Primera A players
Categoría Primera B players
Juventud de Las Piedras players
Deportivo Pereira footballers
Independiente Medellín footballers
Atlético Junior footballers
Expatriate footballers in Colombia
Expatriate footballers in Uruguay